is a Japanese rugby union player who plays as a prop. He previously played for Toyota Verblitz in Japan's domestic Top League. He represented the Sunwolves in the 2017 Super Rugby season.

References

1994 births
Living people
Japanese rugby union players
Rugby union props
Sunwolves players
Toyota Verblitz players